Pooja Kumar is an American actress of Indian descent who works in Tamil, Hindi, and English-language Indian films. After winning Miss India USA in 1995, she pursued a career as an actress and producer. She has appeared in a number of American films and shows, including Man on a Ledge, Brawl in Cell Block 99, Bollywood Hero, Flavors, Hiding Divya, Park Sharks, Bollywood Beats, Night of Henna, Anything for You, Drawing with Chalk, and Knots Urbane. Her Indian films include Vishwaroopam, and Vishwaroopam 2 opposite actor Kamal Haasan, and Uttama Villain. These were shot simultaneously in Hindi and Tamil. She made her Telugu debut with PSV Garuda Vega, starring Rajasekhar.

Early life
Kumar was born in St. Louis, Missouri. Her parents immigrated from India in 1970. She attended Washington University, where she graduated with degrees in political science and finance. She is also trained in Indian classical dance. Kumar won Miss India USA in 1995.

Career
Kumar first signed on to appear in director Keyaar's Tamil film Kadhal Rojave in 1997, but the film's production delays meant that it was only released in 2000 and her stint as an actress in the Tamil film industry went unnoticed. She was earlier signed and then left out of the 1997 film V. I. P, while she had also signed to appear alongside Karthik in Chithra Lakshmanan's Chinna Raja, but was eventually dropped from the project.

In 2003, she received the Screen Actors Guild Emerging Actress Award for Flavors. In 2008, she hosted a late-night live quiz show on Zee TV in India, known as Jaago Aur Jeeto. She appeared in the musical comedy miniseries Bollywood Hero  on IFC in 2008. She starred opposite Saturday Night Live comedian Chris Kattan in the three-part series. In the late 2000s, she appeared in the Pakistani drama serial Ishq Junoon Deewangi on Hum TV. After a long gap, she reappeared onscreen in the film Viswaroopam.

Personal life
Kumar is married to Vishal Joshi. They have a daughter born in 2020.

Selected filmography

Film

Television

References

External links

 
 "Pooja Kumar the face of Bombay Dreams" Rediff – 10 February 2004
 Rohit, Parimal M. "Pooja Kumar – The New Heroine: Rising Star Ready for Primetime with 'Bollywood Hero'", Bollywood Buzzine July 2009

1977 births
Living people
Actresses from St. Louis
Female models from Missouri
American film actresses
American television actresses
American female models
American actresses of Indian descent
American female models of Indian descent
American expatriate actresses in India
Actresses in Hindi cinema
Actresses in Tamil cinema
Actresses in Telugu cinema
21st-century American actresses